Keith Harry Haines (born 19 December 1937) is an English former professional footballer who played in the Football League for Lincoln City.

References

1937 births
Living people
English footballers
Association football defenders
English Football League players
Matlock Town F.C. players
Leeds United F.C. players
Lincoln City F.C. players
Hinckley Athletic F.C. players